Dennis Elmore Biggs (1860 – February 17, 1924) was an American politician in the state of Washington. He served in the Washington State Senate and Washington House of Representatives.

References

1860 births
1924 deaths
Democratic Party members of the Washington House of Representatives
Democratic Party Washington (state) state senators
Politicians from Cincinnati